Les Tonils is a commune in the Drôme department in the Auvergne-Rhône-Alpes region in southeastern France.

It was first inhabited in the year 1300.

Population

Economy
The French goat's cheese Picodon is produced in and around Les Tonils.

See also
Communes of the Drôme department

References

Communes of Drôme